Randall Lynn Stephenson (born April 22, 1960) is a retired American telecommunications executive. He served as chairman and chief executive officer (CEO) of AT&T Inc. from May 9, 2007 – June 30, 2020 and as executive chairman of AT&T Inc. from July 1 until December 31, 2020. He served as National President of the Boy Scouts of America from 2016 to 2018. In April 2020, Stephenson announced he would step down as CEO of AT&T effective July 1, 2020, replaced by John Stankey. In November 2020, Stephenson announced he would step down as executive chairman of AT&T effective January 2021, replaced by William Kennard.

Biography
Stephenson earned a Bachelor of Science in Accounting from the University of Central Oklahoma and a Master of Accountancy from the University of Oklahoma, then began his career in 1982 with Southwestern Bell Telephone in the information-technology organization in Oklahoma. Late in the 1980s through 1990s, he progressed through a series of leadership positions in finance, including an international assignment in Mexico City overseeing SBC's investment in Telefonos de Mexico (Telmex), where, according to Bloomberg, he was mentored by Carlos Slim. In July 2001, he was appointed senior vice president and chief financial officer for SBC, helping the company reduce its net debt from $30 billion to near zero by early 2004. From 2003 to 2004, Stephenson served as chairman of the board of directors for Cingular Wireless. In 2004, he was named chief operating officer of SBC and also appointed by President Bush as National Security Telecommunications Advisory Committee.

Stephenson continued as COO following SBC's acquisition of AT&T in 2005, responsible for all wireless and wireline operations at AT&T. In April 2007, AT&T announced Stephenson would succeed retiring Edward Whitacre as CEO and serve as chairman and CEO of AT&T Inc..

In 2008 Randall Stephenson helped AT&T launch AT&T Aspire and led their "It Can Wait" campaign.

Stephenson was chairman of the Business Roundtable from 2014 to 2016.

In September 2016, Stephenson gave a speech regarding race relations at AT&T’s annual Employee Resource Group conference in Dallas. An employee posted a video of the speech to YouTube, in which Stephenson asked attendees to make a greater effort to understand each other and communicate better through a compelling witness defending Black Lives Matter despite racial tensions in the United States.

During his tenure as CEO, AT&T acquired DirecTV for $49 billion in July 2015 and Time Warner for $85 billion in June 2018. According to Drew FitzGerald of The Wall Street Journal, Stephenson has "transformed the phone company he inherited into one of the world's biggest entertainment companies."

On July 1, 2020, Stephenson retired as CEO of AT&T. He was succeeded by then-COO John Stankey. At the time Stephenson announced his departure, it was acknowledged that the acquisitions of DirectTV and Time Warner had by this point resulted in a massive debt burden of $200 billion for the company, forcing the company to cut back on its capital investments.

Scouting
He was the 36th National President of the Boy Scouts of America, serving from 2016 until 2018. Stephenson, as well as fellow board member Jim Turley, CEO of Ernst & Young, publicly opposed the BSA's practice of banning openly gay Scouts and stated their intention "to work from within the BSA Board to actively encourage dialogue and sustainable progress."

Personal life
Stephenson maintains homes in Preston Hollow, Dallas and Olmos Park, San Antonio, Texas, and Teton Village, WY. Stephenson is a member of the Council on Foreign Relations.

See also
List of chief executive officers

References

External links 
 Official AT&T Bio
 
 2016 CEO of the Year award given by Chief Executive magazine

1960 births
Living people
American chief executives
American chief financial officers
American telecommunications industry businesspeople
AT&T people
National Executive Board of the Boy Scouts of America members
Businesspeople from Oklahoma City
University of Central Oklahoma alumni
University of Oklahoma alumni
American chief operating officers
Presidents of the Boy Scouts of America